Kaveinga poggii is a species of ground beetle in the subfamily Rhysodinae. It was described by R.T. Bell and J.R. Bell in 1985. It is known from Goodenough Island (D'Entrecasteaux Islands, Papua New Guinea). It is named for Roberto Poggi from the Museo Civico di Storia Naturale di Genova.

Kaveinga poggii holotype, a male, measures  in length.

References

Kaveinga
Beetles of Papua New Guinea
Endemic fauna of Papua New Guinea
Beetles described in 1985